Synaphea flexuosa is a shrub endemic to Western Australia.

It is found in the Wheatbelt region of Western Australia between Kulin and Lake Grace where it grows in sandy-loamy soils.

References

Eudicots of Western Australia
flexuosa
Endemic flora of Western Australia
Plants described in 1995